Individual Polish Chess Championship is the most important Polish chess tournament, aiming at selecting the best chess players in Poland. Based on the results of the tournament (mainly), the Polish Chess Federation selects the national and subsequently the olympiad team.

The first men's championship took place in 1926, and the first women's event in 1935, both in Warsaw. Between the First and the Second World War, four men's finals and two women's took place. After the Second World War, the tournament has taken part annually, with minor exceptions. In most cases, they are round-robin tournaments, where men's groups are of 14-16 players, while the women's are 12 to 14. There were only four Swiss system tournaments in men's tournament history (1975, 1976, 1977, and 1979)  and seven in women's (1959, 1965, 1966, 1975, 1976, 1977, 1978). Twice (1937 men and 1962 women) final tournaments attracted international players, however in 1962 medals were awarded only to Polish women players. Twice women's championship (1960 and 1963) as the Polish crew tournament took place (it is signed by *) in the Winners table).

Winners

| valign="top" |
{| class="sortable wikitable"
! # !! Year !! City !! Women's winner
|-
|1
|1935
|Warsaw
|Regina Gerlecka
|-
|2
|1937
|Warsaw
|Regina Gerlecka
|-
|3
|1949
|Łódź
|Róża Herman
|-
|4
|1950
|Toruń
|Róża Herman
|-
|5
|1951
|Częstochowa
|Krystyna Hołuj
|-
|6
|1952
|Krynica
|Krystyna Hołuj
|-
|7
|1953
|Sopot
|Krystyna Hołuj
|-
|8
|1954
|Gdańsk
|Władyslawa Górska
|-
|9
|1955
|Szczecin
|Krystyna Hołuj
|-
|10
|1956
|Lądek-Zdrój
|Krystyna Hołuj
|-
|11
|1957
|Polana
|Krystyna Hołuj
|-
|12
|1958
|Łódź
|Henryka Konarkowska
|-
|13
|1959
|Katowice
|Krystyna Hołuj
|-
|*)
|1960
|Łódź
|Henryka Konarkowska
|-
|14
|1961
|Wrocław
|Apolonia Litwińska
|-
|15
|1962
|Grudziądz
|Anna Jurczyńska
|-
|*)
|1963
|Myślenice
|Henryka Konarkowska
|-
|16
|1964
|Spała
|Henryka Konarkowska
|-
|17
|1965
|Łódź
|Anna Jurczyńska
|-
|18
|1966
|Koszalin
|Krystyna Hołuj-Radzikowska
|-
|19
|1967
|Kielce
|Elżbieta Kowalska
|-
|20
|1968
|Lublin
|Mirosława Litmanowicz
|-
|21
|1969
|Poznań
|Krystyna Hołuj-Radzikowska
|-
|22
|1970
|Kielce
|Bożena Pytel
|-
|23
|1971
|Piotrków Trybunalski
|Hanna Ereńska-Radzewska
|-
|24
|1972
|Lublin
|Hanna Ereńska-Radzewska
|-
|25
|1973
|Grudziądz
|Anna Jurczyńska
|-
|26
|1974
|Polanica Zdrój
|Anna Jurczyńska
|-
|27
|1975
|Wrocław
|Grażyna Szmacińska
|-
|28
|1976
|Istebna
|Grażyna Szmacińska
|-
|29
|1977
|Cieplice
|Hanna Ereńska-Radzewska
|-
|30
|1978
|Elbląg
|Anna Jurczyńska
|-
|31
|1979
|Piotrków Trybunalski
|Hanna Ereńska-Radzewska
|-
|32
|1980
|Częstochowa
|Hanna Ereńska-Radzewska
|-
|33
|1981
|Poznań
|Grażyna Szmacińska
|-
|34
|1982
|Warsaw
|Agnieszka Brustman
|-
|35
|1983
|Tarnów
|Grażyna Szmacińska
|-
|36
|1984
|Konin
|Agnieszka Brustman
|-
|37
|1985
|Sandomierz
|Małgorzata Wiese
|-
|38
|1986
|Konin
|Grażyna Szmacińska
|-
|39
|1987
|Wrocław
|Agnieszka Brustman
|-
|40
|1988
|Bielsko-Biała
|Grażyna Szmacińska
|-
|41
|1989
|Poznań
|Joanna Detko
|-
|42
|1990
|Konin
|Bożena Sikora-Giżyńska
|-
|43
|1991
|Lubniewice
|Czesława Grochot
|-
|44
|1992
|Świeradów-Zdrój
|Krystyna Dąbrowska
|-
|45
|1993
|Lublin
|Barbara Kaczorowska
|-
|46
|1994
|Gdańsk
|Magdalena Gużkowska
|-
|47
|1995
|Warsaw
|Monika Bobrowska (Soćko)
|-
|48
|1996
|Brzeg Dolny
|Agnieszka Brustman
|-
|49
|1997
|Cisna
|Joanna Dworakowska
|-
|50
|1998
|Sopot
|Joanna Dworakowska
|-
|51
|1999
|Wrocław
|Iweta Radziewicz
|-
|52
|2000
|Brzeg Dolny
|Iweta Radziewicz
|-
|53
|2001
|Brzeg Dolny
|Joanna Dworakowska
|-
|54
|2002
|Ostrów Wielkopolski
|Iweta Radziewicz
|-
|55
|2003
|Środa Wielkopolska
|Marta Zielińska (Michna)
|-
|56
|2004
|Warsaw
|Monika Soćko
|-
|57
|2005
|Suwałki
|Iweta Radziewicz
|-
|58
|2006
|Trzebinia
|Jolanta Zawadzka
|-
|59
|2007
|Barlinek
|Iweta Radziewicz (Rajlich)
|-
|60
|2008
|Kraków
|Monika Soćko
|-
|61
|2009
|Bogatynia
|Iweta Rajlich
|-
|62
|2010
|Warsaw
|Monika Soćko
|-
|63
|2011
|Warsaw
|Jolanta Zawadzka
|-
|64
|2012
|Warsaw
|Iweta Rajlich
|-
|65
|2013
|Chorzów
|Monika Soćko
|-
|66
|2014
|Warsaw
|Monika Soćko
|-
|67
|2015
|Poznań
|Jolanta Zawadzka
|-
|68
|2016
|Poznań
||Monika Soćko
|-
|69
|2017
|Warsaw
||Monika Soćko
|-
|-
|70
|2018
|Warsaw
||Jolanta Zawadzka
|-
|71
|2019
|Warsaw
||Iweta Rajlich
|-
|72
|2020
|Ostrow Wielkopolski
||Karina Cyfka
|-
|73
|2021
|Bydgoszcz
||Klaudia Kulon
|-
|74
|2022
|Kruszwica
||Michalina Rudzińska
|-
|}
|}

References

External links
 Polish Chess Federation (pl.)

Chess national championships
Women's chess national championships
Championship
1926 in chess
1935 in chess
Recurring sporting events established in 1926
1926 establishments in Poland
Chess